The 2017 Tennis Championships of Maui was a professional tennis tournament played on outdoor hard courts. It was the eighth edition of the tournament and part of the 2017 ATP Challenger Tour. It took place in Lahaina, Maui, United States between 24–29 January 2017.

Singles main draw entrants

Seeds 

1 Rankings as of 16 January 2017.

Other entrants 
The following players received wildcards into the singles main draw:
  Filip Doležel
  Andre Ilagan
  Bradley Klahn
  Mackenzie McDonald

The following players received entry from the qualifying draw:
  Antoine Bellier
  Li Zhe
  Roberto Quiroz
  Kento Takeuchi

Champions

Singles

 Chung Hyeon def.  Taro Daniel 7–6(7–3), 6–1.

Doubles

 Austin Krajicek /  Jackson Withrow def.  Bradley Klahn /  Tennys Sandgren 6–4, 6–3.

External links 
 

2017 ATP Challenger Tour
Hard court tennis tournaments in the United States